Amélie Le Gall, known as Mademoiselle Lisette or Lisette Marton, was born in 1869 in Quintin and was a French competitive cyclist. She was considered the women's world champion in the sport in 1896.

Early life
Amélie Le Gall was the daughter of a carpenter. She was reportedly working as a shepherdess in Brittany when she was wooed by a male cyclist who married her and trained her in the sport.

Career
Amélie Le Gall began competing in France, at exhibition contests to promote the new sport. In 1895, Marton competed in a race at the Royal Aquarium in London.  She defeated Scottish cyclist Clara Grace for the women's world championship in 1896, and sometimes raced  male riders, as when she defeated Albert Champion. 

She trained with controversial English coach Choppy Warburton and was sponsored by Simpson Chain, a British manufacturer of an innovative-design  bicycle chain. She raced in Chicago in 1898 and in Winnipeg in 1900. 

Her clothing was often described in detail, as the question of what women should wear on a bicycle was a topic of discussion at the time.  "In France, Lisette never wears a dress," reported one Chicago newspaper in 1898, continuing that "Lisette dislikes corsets. To her they seem the culminating point in feminine attire of ugliness, unsuitability, and anti-hygienic stupidity."

References

French female cyclists
1869 births
Sportspeople from Côtes-d'Armor
19th-century French women
Cyclists from Brittany
Year of death missing